Diane de Guldencrone (née de Gobineau; 13 September 1848 – 1930) was a French historian.

Biography
Diane Marguerite Gabrielle Victoire Clémence de Gobineau was born in Paris, the eldest daughter of diplomat, politician and writer Arthur de Gobineau (1816–1882) and Clémence Monnerot (1816–1911).

In 1866, she married Danish baron Ode of Güldencrone (1840–1880) in Athens, Greece. Baron Güldencrone was a marine officier and aide-de-camp to King George I of Greece. The couple had five children: Wilhelm (1867–1878), Arthur (1869–1895), Clémence (1872–1891), Christian (1874–1875) and Marie (1876-1890), who all died before their mother.

Diane de Guldencrone wrote two books: one about the history of Medieval Greece (spanning from the creation of the Principality of Achaea in 1205 to the siege of Athens by the Turks in 1456), and one about the history of Byzantine Italy. She died in Rome.

Works

References

Further reading

External links
 
 A portrait of Diane de Gobineau as a child by Germann-August von Bohn

19th-century French women writers
20th-century French women writers
19th-century French historians
20th-century French historians
French women historians
French Byzantinists
1848 births
Writers from Paris
1930 deaths
Diane